Let Katie Do It is a 1916 American silent film drama directed by Chester and Sidney Franklin and was produced by D. W. Griffith's Fine Arts company. It is also known as Let Katy Do It. A copy is preserved in the Library of Congress collection and UCLA Film & TV.

Cast
 Jane Grey as Katie Standish
 Tully Marshall as Oliver Putnam
 Luray Huntley as Priscilla Standish (*Luray Huntley, wife of Walter Long)
 Charles West as Caleb Adams
 Ralph Lewis as Uncle Dan Standish
 George Pearce as Father Standish
 Walter Long as Pedro Garcia
 Charles Gorman as Carlos
 Violet Radcliffe as Adams' child
 Georgie Stone as Adams' child
 Carmen De Rue as Adams' child
 Francis Carpenter as Adams' child
 Ninon Fovieri as Adams' child
 Lloyd Pearl as Adams' child
 Beulah Burns as Adams' child

uncredited
 George Beranger as Accident witness
 Virginia Lee Corbin as Child

References

External links

American silent feature films
Triangle Film Corporation films
Films directed by Sidney Franklin
Films directed by Millard Webb
1916 drama films
American black-and-white films
Silent American drama films
Surviving American silent films
1910s American films